This is a list of athletes with advanced degrees (PhDs and other degrees at that academic level). Excluded are honorary degrees.

Incomplete or revoked doctorates

References

Athletes
Advanced degrees